The Bodysnatchers is an original novel written by Mark Morris and based on the long-running British science fiction television series Doctor Who.

Plot
The Doctor, Sam and an allied professor work together to stop alien bodysnatchers, grave-robbers and much worse plaguing London.

Continuity
The Zygons appear for the first time since the 1975 television serial Terror of the Zygons. They have also appeared in the Tenth Doctor novel Sting of the Zygons and the Big Finish audio play The Zygon Who Fell to Earth, which references the events of this novel. In 2013, The Zygons appeared in the Eleventh Doctor TV story The Day of the Doctor, to mark 50 years of Doctor Who.
This story also reunited the Doctor with Professor George Litefoot from The Talons of Weng-Chiang.
It is revealed in this story that Sam's room (given to her by the Doctor in the previous novel) is actually Nyssa's old room.
Leela is mentioned, and implied to have children.
When the Zygons destroy the Doctor's Sonic Screwdriver he comments on how long it took him to build another the last time, referencing the fifth Doctor story The Visitation where the Terileptils destroyed the original.
The Zygons' home planet is named as Zygor.
Tuval claims Zygor was destroyed when the Zygons enemies, the Xaranti caused a stellar explosion, probably by destroying its sun.
The HADS (Hostile Action Displacement System) is mentioned.
The State of Temporal Grace is mentioned as the Doctor has repaired it, preventing the Skarasen from acting aggressively.
The way the Doctor changes the subject when asked about Sam in the epilogue implies that this occurs during the period they are separated between Longest Day and Seeing I; the latter novel also implies this.
The Doctor is still searching for a copy of The Strand in the next novel, Genocide.

External links 
The Cloister Library - The Bodysnatchers

Reviews 
The Whoniverse's review on The Bodysnatchers

1997 British novels
1997 science fiction novels
Eighth Doctor Adventures
Novels by Mark Morris
Novels set in London